The  is a historical wooden arch bridge, in the city of Iwakuni, in Yamaguchi Prefecture, Japan.

The pedestrian bridge was built in 1673, spanning the Nishiki River in a series of five wooden arches. The bridge is located on the foot of Mt.Yokoyama, at the top of which lies Iwakuni Castle.

Kikkou Park, which includes the bridge and castle, is a popular tourist destination in Japan, particularly during the Cherry blossom festival in the spring and the autumn color change of the Japanese maples (momiji). It was declared a National Treasure in 1922.

History

After Iwakuni Castle was completed in 1608 by Kikkawa Hiroie, the first lord of Iwakuni Domain, a series of wooden bridges was built. However, most of them were destroyed by floods several times before the construction of Kintai Bridge. Afterwards, Kintai Bridge was built by the third lord, Kikkawa Hiroyoshi in 1673. The new stone piers replaced the old wooden ones. Though thought to be flood-proof, the bridge was destroyed by a flood the next year. As a result, the stone piers were redesigned for greater strength, and a special tax was created to maintain the bridge. This maintenance involved periodically rebuilding the bridge: every 20 years for three spans in the middle, every 40 years for two spans that connect to the banks.

Consequently, the footbridge remained intact for 276 years, until washed away again in a flood from typhoon "Kijia" in 1950. It was in a weakened state at the time, as the Japanese had stopped maintaining the bridge during World War II. In 1953, the bridge was reconstructed similar to the original.

In 1922, the bridge was declared a national treasure. Between 2001 and 2004, all five bridge girders were restored for the first time in 50 years.

Architecture

The bridge is composed of five sequential wooden arch bridges on four stone piers as well as two wooden piers on the dry riverbed where the bridge begins and ends. Each of the three middle spans is 35.1 meters long, while the two end spans are 34.8 meters for a total length of about 175 meters with a width of 5 meters.

Original construction
For nearly three hundred years, the many versions of the bridge stood without the use of metal nails. This was achieved by the careful fitting of the wooden parts and by the construction of the thick girders by clamping and binding them together with metal belts. The main wooden parts of the bridge were covered by sheets of copper for additional durability.

Flood protection
The shape and weight of the bridge made it extremely strong at the top, but incredibly weak from underneath. To address concern that flood waters rushing along the river would destroy the bridge in its entirety, the bridge was designed so that the wooden pathway merely "floats" on top of its frame using mortise and tenon joints. This allowed rising flood waters to lift out the wooden pathway and carry it off down stream while sparing the main structure.

References

External links

Kintai Bridge on bridge-info.org
 Iwakuni Tourism (Japanese)
 Pictures of Kintai-kyo (Japanese)
 Iwakuni Kankou.com  (Japanese)

Places of Scenic Beauty
Bridges in Japan
Tourist attractions in Yamaguchi Prefecture
Buildings and structures in Yamaguchi Prefecture
Roads in Yamaguchi Prefecture
Toll bridges in Japan